Frederick Bickell Guthrie (10 December 1861 – 7 February 1927) was an Australian agricultural chemist and a president of the Royal Society of New South Wales.

Early life
Guthrie was born in Mauritius, the son of Frederick Guthrie, F.R.S. and Agnes Guthrie, née Bickell. Guthrie was educated at University College, London, and at the University of Marburg under Professor Zincke. He was assistant to the professor of chemistry at Queen's College, Cork, from 1882, and in 1888 became demonstrator in chemistry at the Royal College of Science, London under Sir Thomas Thorpe.

Career in Australia
Guthrie came to Australia in 1890 and in the same year was appointed demonstrator in chemistry at the University of Sydney under Archibald Liversidge. In 1892 he was made chemist to the New South Wales department of agriculture. In this department he did much research in connexion with soil analysis, manures, and the milling qualities of wheat. He was also closely associated with William Farrer and his work on wheat breeding; Guthrie devised methods to test small quantities of grain and assess their quality. For periods in 1896, 1904–1905, and 1908-1909 Guthrie was acting professor of chemistry at the University of Sydney. In 1901 he was president of the chemical section of the Australasian Association for the Advancement of Science, and in 1913 president of the agricultural section. He was elected president of the Royal Society of New South Wales for 1903 and was one of the joint honorary secretaries from 1906 to 1910. Guthrie was also an original member of the Commonwealth advisory council of science and industry. He retired from the agricultural department of New South Wales in January 1924, and died of cancer at Sydney on 7 February 1927.

Legacy
Guthrie married Ada Adams, who survived him with a daughter. He lost his two sons in World War I. He wrote many papers for scientific societies some of which were published as pamphlets. His work as an economic and agricultural chemist was of widespread benefit to primary production in Australia. The Guthrie medal, named in his honour, is awarded every three years by the Royal Australian Chemical Institute.

References

Additional sources listed by the Australian Dictionary of Biography:
Agricultural Gazette of New South Wales, 6 (1895), p 159, 9 (1898), p 363; Department of Agriculture (New South Wales), Science Bulletin, 1912, no 7, 1914, no 11; Royal Australian Chemical Institute, Proceedings, 40 (1973), p 368; Records of the Australian Academy of Science, 4 (Nov 1978 – Apr 79), no 1, p 7, and for bibliography; Sydney Morning Herald, 20 Apr 1923, 8 Feb 1927; The Bulletin, 10 Feb 1927

External links
 

1861 births
1927 deaths
Australian chemists
Academics of Queens College Cork